Michael from the kindred Szentemágócs (died after 1292) was a Hungarian nobleman who served as Palatine of Hungary from 1291 to 1292, during the reign of Andrew III of Hungary.

Career
Michael was born into the gens (clan) Szentemágócs, which possessed lands throughout Hungary, for instance in Baranya, Tolna, Szabolcs and Zemplén counties. Michael belonged to the clan's Transdanubian branch. His father was a certain Albert, who had a brother Györk (or Gurk). Michael's cousins were magister Gregory, Apsa, Mágócs, Ladislaus and Inabor. His close relative was Thomas, Bishop of Bosnia too. Albert appears in contemporary records in 1264, when – as an influential local lord – mediated a dispute between the nobles of Gerenás in Tolna County and the Knights Hospitaller.

In November 1291, Michael acted as ad-litem judge in a lawsuit between the Szakadáti family and the sons of Matthew Szentemágócs over the estate Bika in Baranya County. Shortly after, Michael was installed Palatine of Hungary in December 1291, holding the office with Amadeus Aba simultaneously. His appointment took place, when the Kőszegis rebelled against Andrew III following the Austrian–Hungarian War.This was the first known case, when two office-holders bore the title at the same time. While Amadeus Aba dealt with affairs in Tiszántúl, Michael was responsible for affairs in Transdanubia. Michael already served as palatine, when – alongside several other members of the Szentemágócs kindred – approved to certain members of the clan to regain the patronage over the Cistercian St. Mary monastery in Esztergom in or out of court.

According to historian Attila Zsoldos, Michael held the dignity until late 1292, when Andrew III was liberated from the Kőszegis' captivity. Amadeus Aba remained the sole office-holder of the position of palatine for the next year.

References

Sources

 
 
 

13th-century Hungarian people
Michael
Palatines of Hungary